Jens Dautzenberg (born 24 May 1974, in Aachen) is a former German sprinter who specialised in the 400 metres.

He competed on the German 4 × 400 metres relay team in two editions of the IAAF World Cup. In 1998 he finished fifth with teammates Klaus Ehmsperger, Marc Alexander Scheer and Nils Schumann and in 2002 he finished sixth with teammates Ingo Schultz, Ruwen Faller and Lars Figura.

His personal best time is 46.19 seconds, achieved in July 2002 in Wattenscheid.

References 
 

1974 births
Living people
Sportspeople from Aachen
German male sprinters
German national athletics champions